The Generation of Independence Party is an Armenian political party in Artsakh.

History
The Generation of Independence Party was established on 11 August 2018. Its founder and current party leader is Ruslan Israelyan.

In August 2019, it was announced that Israelyan would run for the presidency of Artsakh during a party congress and that he would lead the party in the 2020 Artsakhian general election.

Ideology
The party advocates for the unification of Artsakh and Armenia, and the establishment of a United Armenia. Domestically, the party advocates for further economic development of Artsakh, respecting human and civil rights, improving education and fighting corruption.

Israelyan has also called for Artsakh to be included in any future peace talks between Armenia and Azerbaijan regarding the Nagorno-Karabakh conflict.

Electoral record
Following the 2020 election, the party gained just 0.50% of the votes after the first round of voting, failing to qualify for the second round. The party failed to gain any seats in the National Assembly and currently acts as an extra-parliamentary force.

See also

List of political parties in Artsakh
Politics of Artsakh

References

External links	
 Generation of Independence Party Facebook page

Political parties in the Republic of Artsakh
Political parties established in 2018